[[File:FloraAustralasica 0047b Patersonia lanata.tif|thumb|Illustration from Robert Sweet's Flora Australasica]]Patersonia lanata, commonly known as woolly patersonia, is a species of flowering plant in the family Iridaceae family and is endemic to the south of Western Australia. It is a tufted perennial herb with sword-shaped leaves and blue-violet flowers.

 Taxonomy Patersonia lanata was first formally described in 1810 by Robert Brown  in his Prodromus Florae Novae Hollandiae et Insulae Van Diemen. The specific epithet (lanata) means "woolly", referring to the edges of the leaves, the scape, bracts and ovary.

In 1986, David Alan Cooke described two forms of Patersonia lanata and the names are accepted by the Australian Plant Census:
 Patersonia lanata f. calvata D.A.Cooke has glabrous leaf margins and a more or less glabrous scape;
 Patersonia lanata R.Br. f. lanata D.A.Cooke has leaf margins that have woolly brown hairs near the base and a woolly-brown scape.

Distribution and habitat
Woolly patersonia grows in heath on the coastal plain of southern Western Australia between Two Peoples Bay and Israelite Bay in the Esperance Plains, Jarrah Forest and Mallee biogeographic regions. Both forms occur in the same range, but f. calvata'' is less common.

References

lanata
Eudicots of Western Australia
Plants described in 1810
Taxa named by Robert Brown (botanist, born 1773)